Joshua Cory Breslow (born May 23, 1987) is a digital host with LiveNOW from FOX, operating out of Orlando, Florida. He previously was the Alert Desk anchor for Good Morning Nashville on WKRN-TV, the ABC affiliate in Nashville, Tennessee. Prior to that, he served as anchor of the program’s weekend edition alongside Morgan Hightower. Breslow has also worked at WDRB-TV and WLEX-TV.

Breslow is a graduate of the University of Florida in Gainesville, Florida.

References 

1987 births
Living people
Television anchors from Nashville, Tennessee
University of Florida alumni